The 2015–16 West Coast Conference men's basketball season began with practices in October 2015 and ended with the 2016 West Coast Conference men's basketball tournament at the Orleans Arena March 4–8, 2016 in Paradise, Nevada. The regular season began in November, with the conference schedule starting at the end of December.

This was the 65th season for WCC men's basketball, and the 27th under its current name of "West Coast Conference". The conference was founded in 1952 as the California Basketball Association, became the West Coast Athletic Conference in 1956, and dropped the word "Athletic" in 1989.

Pre-season
 Pre-season media day took place in October at the Time Warner Cable SportsNet and Time Warner Cable Deportes Studios. Video interviews were to be hosted on the WCC's streaming video outlet, TheW.tv, beginning at 11:30 AM PDT. Jeff Lampe of WCC Live interviewed each coach and got a preview of their respective season. The regional television schedule announcement, the Pre-season Conference team, and the pre-season coaches rankings were some of the additional events that took place.

2015–16 West Coast Men's Basketball Media Poll
The Pre-season poll was announced at the conferences media day in October 2016.
 
Rank, School (first-place votes), Points
1. Gonzaga (9), 81
2. BYU (1), 73
3. Pepperdine, 62
4. St. Mary's, 58
5. Portland, 43 
6. Santa Clara, 37
7. Pacific, 32
7. San Francisco, 32
9. San Diego, 17
10. Loyola Marymount, 15

2015–16 West Coast Men's Preseason All-West Conference Team
Player, School, Yr., Pos.
Kyle Collinsworth, BYU, Sr., G
Chase Fischer, BYU, Sr., G
Przemek Karnowski, Gonzaga, Sr., C
Domantas Sabonis, Gonzaga, So., F
Kyle Wiltjer, Gonzaga, Sr., F
T. J. Wallace, Pacific, Jr., G
Stacy Davis, Pepperdine, Sr., F
Alec Wintering, Portland, Sr., G
Tim Derksen, San Francisco, Sr., G
Jared Brownridge, Santa Clara, Jr., G

College Sports Madness Preseason All-West Conference Team

Coach of the Year- Mark Few, Gonzaga
Player of the Year- Kyle Wiltjer, Gonzaga
Freshman of the Year- Josh Perkins, Gonzaga

First Team
Jared Brownridge, G, Santa Clara
Kyle Collinsworth, G, BYU
Stacy Davis, G/F, Pepperdine
Kyle Wiltjer, F, Gonzaga
Domantas Sabonis, F/C, Gonzaga

Second Team
Alec Wintering, G, Portland
T.J. Wallace, G, Pacific
Tim Derksen, G/F, San Francisco
Jett Raines, F, Pepperdine
Przemek Karnowski, F/C, Gonzaga

Third Team
Chase Fischer, G, BYU
Joe Rahon, G, Saint Mary's
Shawn Olden, G, Pepperdine
Bryce Pressley, G/F, Portland
Kyle Davis, F/C, BYU

Fourth Team
Eric McClellan, G, Gonzaga
Josh Perkins, G, Gonzaga
Duda Sanadze, G, San Diego
Brandon Brown, G/F, Loyola Marymount
Matt Hubbard, F/C, Santa Clara

Rankings
The AP Poll does not do a post-season rankings. As a result, their last rankings are Week 19. The Coaches Poll does a post-season poll and the end of the NCAA Tournament.

Non-Conference games
To be posted shortly.

Conference games

Composite Matrix
This table summarizes the head-to-head results between teams in conference play.

Conference tournament

  March 4–8, 2016– West Coast Conference Basketball Tournament, Orleans Arena, Paradise, Nevada.

Bracket

Pacific has placed themselves on a post-season probation and will not participate in the 2016 WCC Tournament.

Head coaches
Dave Rose, BYU
Mark Few, Gonzaga
Mike Dunlap, Loyola Marymount
Ron Verlin, Pacific
Marty Wilson, Pepperdine
Eric Reveno, Portland
Randy Bennett, Saint Mary's
Lamont Smith, San Diego
Rex Walters, San Francisco
Kerry Keating, Santa Clara

Postseason

NCAA tournament

NIT

CBI

CiT

Awards and honors

WCC Player-of-the-Week
The WCC player of the week awards are given each Monday. 

 Nov. 16- Kyle Davis, F, BYU
 Nov. 30- Kyle Collinsworth, G, BYU & Kyle Wiltjer, F, Gonzaga
 Dec. 14- Stacy Davis, F, Pepperdine
 Dec. 28- Alec Wintering, G, Portland
 Jan. 11- Kyle Collinsworth, G, BYU (2)
 Jan. 25- Adom Jacko, F, Loyola Marymount
 Feb. 8- Alec Wintering, G, Portland
 Feb. 22-
 Nov. 23- Domantas Sabonis, F, Gonzaga
 Dec. 7- Nate Kratch, F, Santa Clara
 Dec. 21- Domantas Sabonis, F, Gonzaga (2)
 Jan. 4- Jared Brownridge, G, Santa Clara
 Jan. 18- Jock Landale, C, Saint Mary's
 Feb. 1- Kyle Wiltjer, F, Gonzaga (2)
 Feb. 15- Nick Emery, G, BYU
 Feb. 29-

College Madnesss West Coast Player of the Week
College Madness WCC player of the Week Awards are given every Sunday. 

 Nov. 15- Kyle Davis, F, BYU
 Nov. 29- Jared Brownridge, G, Santa Clara
 Dec. 13- Stacy Davis, F, Pepperdine
 Dec. 27- Chase Fischer, G, BYU
 Jan. 10- Nick Emery, G, BYU
 Jan. 24- Evan Fitzner, C, Saint Mary's
 Feb. 7- Alec Wintering, G, Portland (Also High Major player of the Week) 
 Feb. 21- 
 Nov. 22- Domantas Sabonis, F, Gonzaga
 Dec. 6- Nate Kratch, F, Santa Clara
 Dec. 20- Domantas Sabonis, F, Gonzaga
 Jan. 3- Kyle Wiltjer, F, Gonzaga
 Jan. 17- David Humphries, G, Loyola Marymount
 Jan. 31- Kyle Wiltjer, F, Gonzaga
 Feb. 14- Nick Emery, G, BYU (Also High Major player of the week)
 Feb. 28-

National Player of the Week Awards
To Be Determined after the season begins.

All-Americans

Conference Awards
The voting body for all conference awards is league coaches, with voting taking place at the end of the regular season.

Individual Honors

 Player of the Year: Kyle Collinsworth, BYU
 Coach of the Year: Randy Bennett, Saint Mary's
 Defensive Player of the Year: Eric McClellan, Gonzaga
 Newcomer of the Year: Joe Rahon, Saint Mary's

First-Team All-Conference

Second-Team All-Conference

Honorable Mention

All-Freshman

See also
2015-16 NCAA Division I men's basketball season
West Coast Conference men's basketball tournament
2015–16 West Coast Conference women's basketball season
West Coast Conference women's basketball tournament
2016 West Coast Conference women's basketball tournament

References